Paranauchenia is an extinct genus of South American litopterns belonging to the family Macraucheniidae. It is known only from fossil finds in Argentina. It possessed three toes and long limbs. The species Paranauchenia denticulata lived in the Miocene epoch in Argentina. Fossils have been found in the Arroyo Chasicó and Ituzaingó Formations of Argentina.

Classification 
Cladogram based in the phylogenetic analysis published by Schmidt et al., 2014, showing the position of Paranauchenia:

References 

Macraucheniids
Miocene genus extinctions
Miocene mammals of South America
Huayquerian
Neogene Argentina
Fossils of Argentina
Ituzaingó Formation
 
Fossil taxa described in 1904
Taxa named by Florentino Ameghino
Prehistoric placental genera